Urho Tallgren (9 October 1894 – 31 December 1959) was a Finnish long-distance runner. He competed in the marathon at the 1920 Summer Olympics.

References

External links
 

1894 births
1959 deaths
Athletes (track and field) at the 1920 Summer Olympics
Finnish male long-distance runners
Finnish male marathon runners
Olympic athletes of Finland
Athletes from Helsinki